Payamburnu is a village in the Saimbeyli, Adana Province, Turkey.

References

Villages in Saimbeyli District